The 1943 March Field Flyers football team represented the United States Army Air Forces' Fourth Air Force stationed at March Field during the 1943 college football season. The base was located in Riverside, California. The team compiled a 9–1 record, outscored all opponents by a total of 292 to 65, and was ranked No. 10 in the final AP Poll. It defeated both UCLA and USC (then ranked No. 9), and it sole loss was on the road against Washington.

The team was coached by Major Paul J. Schissler, a former NFL coach. The team was led on the field by Jack Jacobs, who was later inducted into the Canadian Football Hall of Fame.

Schedule

References

March Field
March Field Flyers football seasons
March Field Flyers football